The 2009 Women's Six Nations Championship, also known as the 2009 RBS Women's 6 Nations, was the eighth series of the rugby union Women's Six Nations Championship, due to the tournament's sponsorship by the Royal Bank of Scotland.

England comfortably won a third successive Grand Slam in 2008 and were favourites to make the four in 2009. However, though England did retain the title, it was only on points difference. The loss of key players to the World Cup Sevens was significant in making this an extraordinary championship full of remarkable results such as:

 Ireland beat France for the first time 
 Wales beat England for the first time
 Triple Crown to Wales
 Best ever championships finishes for Ireland and Wales
 Worst ever finish for France

The fixtures for the Women's Six Nations ran parallel those of the men's tournament.

Final table

Week 1

Week 2

Week 3

Week 4

Week 5

Scorers

See also
Women's Six Nations Championship
Women's international rugby

External links
The official RBS Six Nations Site

References

2009
2009 rugby union tournaments for national teams
2008–09 in Irish rugby union
2008–09 in English rugby union
2008–09 in Welsh rugby union
2008–09 in Scottish rugby union
2008–09 in French rugby union
2008–09 in Italian rugby union
2008–09 in European women's rugby union
rugby union
rugby union
rugby union
rugby union
Women
rugby union
rugby union
Women's Six Nations
Women's Six Nations